Arctostaphylos (from   "bear" and   "bunch of grapes") is a genus of plants comprising the manzanitas and bearberries. They are shrubs or small trees.

There are about 60 species, of Arctostaphylos, ranging from ground-hugging arctic, coastal, and mountain species to small trees up to 6 m tall. Most are evergreen (one species deciduous), with small oval leaves 1–7 cm long, arranged spirally on the stems. The flowers are bell-shaped, white or pale pink, and borne in small clusters of 2–20 together; flowering is in the spring. The fruit are small berries, ripening in the summer or autumn. The berries of some species are edible.

Arctostaphylos species are used as food plants by the larvae of some Lepidoptera species including Coleophora arctostaphyli (which feeds exclusively on A. uva-ursi) and Coleophora glaucella.

Distribution

Manzanitas, the bulk of Arctostaphylos species, are present in the chaparral biome of western North America, where they occur from southern British Columbia in Canada, Washington to California and New Mexico in the United States, and throughout much of northern and central Mexico.

Three species, the bearberries, A. alpina (alpine bearberry), A. rubra (red bearberry) and A. uva-ursi (common bearberry), have adapted to arctic and subarctic climates, and have a circumpolar distribution in northern North America, Asia and Europe.

An unusual association of manzanita occurs on Hood Mountain, in Sonoma County, California, where stands of pygmy forest dominated by Mendocino cypress are found.

Fossil record
One fossil fruit of  †Arctostaphylos globula and several fossil fruits of †Arctostaphylos menzelii have been described from middle Miocene strata of the Fasterholt area near Silkeborg in Central Jutland, Denmark.

Cultivation
Cultivation is generally difficult due to fungal diseases, and often salinity and alkalinity. Overhead watering should be avoided in hot weather. Some cultivars are easier to grow.

Taxonomy
The following species are recognised in the genus Arctostaphylos:
 
Arctostaphylos acutifolia 
Arctostaphylos andersonii 
Arctostaphylos auriculata 
Arctostaphylos australis 
Arctostaphylos bakeri 
Arctostaphylos bolensis 
Arctostaphylos canescens 
Arctostaphylos catalinae 
Arctostaphylos caucasica 
Arctostaphylos columbiana 
Arctostaphylos confertiflora 
Arctostaphylos cratericola 
Arctostaphylos crustacea 
Arctostaphylos cruzensis 
Arctostaphylos densiflora 
Arctostaphylos edmundsii 
Arctostaphylos franciscana 
Arctostaphylos gabilanensis 
Arctostaphylos glandulosa 
Arctostaphylos glauca 
Arctostaphylos glutinosa 
Arctostaphylos × helleri 
Arctostaphylos hispidula 
Arctostaphylos hookeri 
Arctostaphylos hooveri 
Arctostaphylos imbricata 
Arctostaphylos incognita 
Arctostaphylos insularis 
Arctostaphylos × jepsonii 
Arctostaphylos klamathensis 
Arctostaphylos × laxiflora 
Arctostaphylos luciana 
Arctostaphylos malloryi 
Arctostaphylos manzanita 
Arctostaphylos × media 
Arctostaphylos mewukka 
Arctostaphylos montana 
Arctostaphylos montaraensis 
Arctostaphylos montereyensis 
Arctostaphylos moranii 
Arctostaphylos morroensis 
Arctostaphylos myrtifolia 
Arctostaphylos nevadensis 
Arctostaphylos nissenana 
Arctostaphylos nortensis 
Arctostaphylos nummularia 
Arctostaphylos obispoensis 
Arctostaphylos ohloneana 
Arctostaphylos osoensis 
Arctostaphylos otayensis 
Arctostaphylos pacifica 
Arctostaphylos pajaroensis 
Arctostaphylos pallida 
Arctostaphylos parryana 
Arctostaphylos × parvifolia 
Arctostaphylos patula 
Arctostaphylos pechoensis 
Arctostaphylos peninsularis 
Arctostaphylos pilosula 
Arctostaphylos pringlei 
Arctostaphylos pumila 
Arctostaphylos pungens 
Arctostaphylos purissima 
Arctostaphylos rainbowensis 
Arctostaphylos refugioensis 
Arctostaphylos regismontana 
Arctostaphylos × repens 
Arctostaphylos rudis 
Arctostaphylos sensitiva 
Arctostaphylos silvicola 
Arctostaphylos stanfordiana 
Arctostaphylos × strigosa 
Arctostaphylos tomentosa 
Arctostaphylos uva-ursi 
Arctostaphylos virgata 
Arctostaphylos viridissima 
Arctostaphylos viscida 
Arctostaphylos wellsii 

See also the closely related genus Comarostaphylis, previously often included in Arctostaphylos.

References

Further reading
 
  
 Treatment from the Jepson Manual
 
 

 
Ericaceae genera
Plants used in Native American cuisine
Plants used in traditional Native American medicine
Natural history of the California chaparral and woodlands
Garden plants of North America
Bird food plants
Drought-tolerant plants